Falcon Express may refer to:

Falcon Express Cargo Airlines, a cargo airline based in Dubai, United Arab Emirates
Falcon Air Express, an airline based in Miami, Florida, US